Santa Clara-a-Velha is a civil parish in the municipality of Odemira, Portugal. The population in 2011 was 873, in an area of 163.67 km2. It was formed in 2013 by the merger of the former parishes Santa Clara-a-Velha and Pereiras-Gare. The dam of Santa Clara (Barragem de Santa Clara), one of the largest dams in Europe, is located here.

References

Freguesias of Odemira